The 1990 London Marathon was the 10th running of the annual marathon race in London, United Kingdom, which took place on Sunday, 22 April. The elite men's race was won by home athlete Allister Hutton in a time of 2:10:10 hours and the women's race was won by Poland's Wanda Panfil in 2:26:31.

In the wheelchair races, Sweden's Håkan Ericsson (1:57:12) and Denmark's Connie Hansen (2:10:25) set course records in the men's and women's divisions, respectively. This was the first time that the winning time in the women's wheelchair race surpassed that of the women's able-bodied race.

Around 73,000 people applied to enter the race, of which 34,882 had their applications accepted and around 26,500 started the race. A total of 25,013 runners finished the race.

Results

Men

Women

Wheelchair men

Wheelchair women

References

Results
Results. Association of Road Racing Statisticians. Retrieved 2020-04-19.

External links

Official website

1990
London Marathon
Marathon
London Marathon